Jeff West, Jeffrey West, or Geoffrey West may be:
Geoffrey West (born 1940), British physicist
Jeff West (American football) (born 1953), American football player
Jeffrey James West (1950–2022), British clergyman and historian of buildings
Jeffrey K. West (born 1950), British historian of buildings